SunKissed Lola is a Filipino rock band formed in Olongapo, Zambales in 2021. The group consists of Dan Ombao (lead vocals, guitar), Alvin Serito (lead vocals, acoustic guitar), Laura Lacbain (lead vocals), Danj Quimson (bass guitar), and Genson Viloria (drums).

The band gained prominence with the success of their single "Pasilyo" (2022), breaking records in Spotify Philippines and Billboard Philippines Songs as one of the most successful OPM songs in the streaming era.

History 
On July 27, 2019, Dan Ombao finished as the third runner-up on the first season of the reality singing competition Idol Philippines, behind winner Zephanie Dimaranan. After the show, Ombao pursued a solo career as he continued his music scholarship at University of the Philippines Diliman. On September 19, 2021, Alvin Serito placed third overall on the wildcard round of Wishcovery Originals by Wish 107.5, ranking first for YouTube views.

2021: Formation 
SunKissed Lola was formed on December 13, 2021, while Ombao and Serito were looking for a place around Olongapo City to rehearse for a wedding gig. Ombao inquired to Genson Viloria about available studios around the area where they could practice. Danj Quimson, nephew of Rockstar keyboardist Norman Quimson, lent his studio as Viloria's previous bandmate. The quartet jammed on the same day, sharing original songs that led to the band's creation.

2022-present: Debut and Pasilyo 
Laura Lacbain, an accountancy alumna from Subic Bay, joined her former bandmates Viloria and Quimson as one of the band's vocalists in March 2022. On July 30, 2022, the band announced its plans to release their debut single "Makalimutan Ka" to streaming platforms on August 19. While promoting their debut, Serito joined the second season of Idol Philippines, only reaching the Do-or-Die middle round of the competition and being eliminated on the August 7 episode of the program.

The band released a live performance video to their YouTube channel on August 26, rehearsing the song "Eba" for Filipino rapper Kiyo as his supporting act in select venues. They released their follow-up single "HKP" to music sites on September 16, along with a visualizer. They made their first online guesting on October 25 for MOR Entertainment.

On October 28, SunKissed Lola released their third single "Pasilyo" across multiple platforms. Described as a romantic wedding anthem, the track debuted on top of the Spotify Viral 50 - Philippines chart dated November 23. It reached number one on Spotify Philippines and broke the record for the biggest single-day streams for an OPM song. It topped Billboard Philippines Songs, making SunKissed Lola the first Filipino band to lead the chart. The band accompanied Kiyo as his supporting act for Enchanted Kingdom's Salo-Salo Fest on December 2 in Santa Rosa, Laguna. The group held their first major performance of "Pasilyo" online in iWant ASAP on December 4. Their Wish 107.5 Bus performance of "Pasilyo" went viral, accumulating 2 million views on YouTube as of March 8, 2023.

SunKissed Lola released "White Toyota" as their fourth single on January 6, 2023, describing the track as an ode to "road trips". They will release "Damag" as their fifth single on March 17.

Band members

Current members 
 Dan Ombao - lead vocals, lead guitar, songwriter (2021–present)
 Alvin "Bino" Serito - lead vocals, acoustic guitar, songwriter (2021–present)
 Laura Lacbain - lead singer, backing vocals (2022–present)
 Danj Quimson - bass guitar, songwriter (2021–present)
 Genson Viloria - drums (2021–present)

Discography

Singles

References

External links 

 
 
 SunKissed Lola on YouTube

Filipino rock music groups
Filipino pop music groups
Filipino indie rock groups
Musical groups established in 2021
2021 establishments in the Philippines